John Francis Hennessey (October 27, 1900 – August 18, 1981) was a top American tennis player of the 1920s.

Career
Hennessey was ranked among the 10 best American players three times, his highest ranking being No. 4 in 1928. In both 1927 and 1928 he was the world No. 8 ranked player by A Wallis Myers.

In 1925 he and Ray Casey reached the finals of the Wimbledon doubles. In an era in which tournament doubles matches were considered almost as important as singles, they lost one of the most famous matches in the early history of tennis, being beaten 4–6, 9–11, 6–4, 6–1, 3–6 by one of the great French teams of Jean Borotra and René Lacoste.

Hennessey and George Lott won the 1928 doubles title at the U.S. Nationals, the same year that Hennessey lost two singles matches in the final Challenge Round of the Davis Cup against France.  Hennessey reached the quarterfinals of the 1927 U.S. National championship and the quarterfinals at Wimbledon in both 1925 and 1928.  A July 14, 1924 Time Magazine article called him The Indianapolis Cyclone.

He also won the 1920 singles title at the  Tri-State Tennis Tournament, now known as the Cincinnati Masters. He reached the singles final there in 1919 and was the doubles champion there in 1917 (with Albrecht Kipp) and 1920 (with Fritz Bastian).

At the Western Tennis Championships he won the singles title in 1922 and was a finalist in 1924 and 1927. In doubles he won the title in 1924 and 1926 (both with Alfred Chapin) and was a finalist in 1927 with Emmett Paré. 

Also in 1927, he was runner-up at the Illinois State championship, losing in a five-set final to Bill Tilden.

In 1984 Hennessey was one of the first four inductees into the USTA/Midwest Section Hall of Fame.  There is an annual John F. Hennessey Open tournament in Indianapolis for junior players.

Grand Slam finals

Doubles (1 title, 1 runner-up)

See also
List of male tennis players

References

External links
 
 
 

American male tennis players
Tennis players from Indianapolis
United States National champions (tennis)
1900 births
1981 deaths
Grand Slam (tennis) champions in men's doubles